The Muse is a 1999 comedy film starring Albert Brooks, Sharon Stone, Andie MacDowell and Jeff Bridges. It is the sixth film to be directed by Brooks, from a screenplay co-written with Monica Johnson. Stone portrays the titular muse who is tasked with reviving the career of a once-celebrated Hollywood screenwriter, played by Brooks. The film also features numerous cameos from well-known filmmakers, including Martin Scorsese and James Cameron.

The film received mixed reviews and did not meet with large box office success, grossing only about $11 million domestically. Sharon Stone earned a nomination for a Golden Globe Award for Best Actress in a Motion Picture - Musical or Comedy.

Plot
After winning a lifetime achievement award, esteemed screenwriter Steven Phillips (Brooks) has a rude awakening. Believing the award has no real meaning, he finds out it means his career is over. His studio reneged on renewing his contract, telling him he's "lost his edge." Junior exec Josh Martin (Mark Feuerstein) tells him his new script is dull and to be off the lot by 5 over lunch.

Desperate to revive his career, he seeks advice from very successful screenwriter Jack (Bridges), who arranges an introduction to Sarah (Stone), a modern-day muse who can inspire anyone. She has lavish demands (expensive hotel rooms, gifts from Tiffany's), much to his wife Laura's chagrin (MacDowell).

Steven isn't sure if she is authentic or a charlatan. She takes him to Long Beach, where they bump into writer-director Rob Reiner, who Sarah clearly knows. There, Steven gets an idea for a movie set in an aquarium, with Jim Carrey as the lead.

As Sarah's demands increase, Steven's apprehensive wife begins to be won over. Through the muse's encouragement Laura decides to pursue her dream of baking and selling cookies, to great success.

To save money, Sarah is invited to move into their house. Steven, however, is frustrated because she spends more time helping others—Hollywood writers and directors like James Cameron and Martin Scorsese, who come to Steven's house to see her. He even surrenders his own bedroom to her, sleeping in the guest house.

When he pleads for a good ending for his aquarium screenplay, Sarah points Steven in the right direction, inspiring him with a great idea. Steven's agent Hal is thrilled and urges him to finish the script as quickly as possible, which he does.

The following morning, though, two visitors come to Steven's, doctors from a mental clinic. They tell him Sarah is an escaped psychiatric patient from their asylum with multiple personality disorder. They find the whole "muse" idea hilarious. When they try to find Sarah to take her back, they discover that she has escaped and decide not to look for her, as she can come and go anytime she wants.

The junior exec, Josh, loves Steven's script, but breaks the news it is already in production at another studio—by Rob Reiner. A broken-hearted Steven goes to work in his wife's new cookie business.

Things look up when the agent calls to tell Steven that the Reiner project fell through and the studio wants to purchase his version, contingent upon a few changes. An excited Steven goes to the studio, where a secretary reveals that Josh was fired for stealing and they have a new boss in charge, Christine. Steven is shocked to see Christine is Sarah in a black wig. She takes Steven's arm and insists that they discuss the changes over a nice, expensive lunch, which she expects him to pay for. Steven frantically tries to comprehend what is happening.

Cast

Soundtrack

Pop rock musician Elton John composed the soundtrack for The Muse.

Reception
The Muse was a slight box office flop, grossing about $11 million domestically on an estimated budget of $15 million. It did relatively poorly at the box office compared to some of Brooks' other films, such as Defending Your Life (1991), which made $16 million, and Mother (1996), which made $19 million. Most complained that the problem was Brooks' lacking energy in his direction of the film. Critical reception was lukewarm, with the film holding a 53% rating at Rotten Tomatoes based on 78 reviews, with the consensus; "Despite quirky and original writing, the subject matter feels too removed to produce laughs", but critics who were fans of the film included Leonard Maltin, Roger Ebert, and Desson Howe.

Wade Major, writing in Boxoffice, called it “a first-rate Hollywood satire that fearlessly goes so far as to even name names. Agents, executives, directors, actors and even writers are given their lumps—many showing up to do the on-screen damage themselves in a cascade of self-deprecating cameos. Stone’s dizzy Muse, however, is the film’s most delightful surprise, providing an energetic counterpoint to Brooks’ neurotic fatalism…”

Variety critic Todd McCarthy thought it “Typically fresh and idiosyncratic in the writing but often flat directorially.” McCarthy also believed that its commercial potential was restricted to “sophisticated upscale audiences.” Janet Maslin of the New York Times, however, thought it was “one of Mr. Brooks’s most broadly entertaining films,” with “enough of a stellar twinkle to bring it to a more general audience.”

In a three-star review, Roger Ebert thought “the movie is good but not great Brooks; not the equal of ‘Lost in America’ or ‘Mother,’ but smart, funny—and edgy.” Los Angeles Times critic Kenneth Turan wrote, “Underneath all its humor, ‘The Muse’ manages to casually deal with some fascinating issues, such as the nature of creativity and inspiration and the important role belief has in making things happen. After all, as someone says, ‘This is Hollywood. People here believe anything.’”

Golden Globe controversy
In 1999, Helmut Voss, then president of the Hollywood Foreign Press Association, who give the annual Golden Globe Awards, ordered all 82 of its members to return gift luxury watches sent by either Sharon Stone or USA/October Films (now merged into Focus Features). The luxury watches were considered promotions for a nomination for Stone's performance in the film. According to Variety, Voss ordered the return of the gifts "to protect the integrity of its award". Stone received the nomination for Best Actress in a Motion Picture Musical or Comedy, but lost to Janet McTeer for Tumbleweeds.

References

External links 
 
 
 
 

1999 films
1990s fantasy comedy films
American fantasy comedy films
American satirical films
Films about screenwriters
Films directed by Albert Brooks
Films with screenplays by Albert Brooks
Films with screenplays by Monica Johnson
1999 comedy films
1990s English-language films
1990s American films